Dot Lake (Kelt’aaddh Menn’ in Tanacross) is a census-designated place (CDP) in Southeast Fairbanks Census Area, Alaska, United States.  It is located on the Alaska Highway between Delta Junction and Tok.  The population was 13 at the 2010 census, down from 19 in 2000.

Geography
Dot Lake is located at  (63.658742, -144.065816).

Demographics

Dot Lake first appeared on the 1960 U.S. Census as an unincorporated village. It was made a census-designated place (CDP) in 1980. Dot Lake Village, a native (Alaskan Indian) village within the Dot Lake CDP, was carved off as a separate CDP in 2000, which accounted for the substantial drop in population.

As of the census of 2000, there were 19 people, 10 households, and 6 families residing in the CDP. The population density was 0.1 people per square mile (0.0/km2). There were 19 housing units at an average density of 0.1/sq mi (0.0/km2). The racial makeup of the CDP was 84.21% White, and 15.79% from two or more races.

There were 10 households, out of which 20.0% had children under the age of 18 living with them, 50.0% were married couples living together, 10.0% had a female householder with no husband present, and 40.0% were non-families. 40.0% of all households were made up of individuals, and 20.0% had someone living alone who was 65 years of age or older. The average household size was 1.90 and the average family size was 2.50.

In the CDP, the population was spread out, with 15.8% under the age of 18, 5.3% from 18 to 24, 26.3% from 25 to 44, 42.1% from 45 to 64, and 10.5% who were 65 years of age or older. The median age was 46 years. For every 100 females, there were 90.0 males. For every 100 females age 18 and over, there were 77.8 males.

The median income for a household in the CDP was $13,750, and the median income for a family was $62,500. Males had a median income of $46,250 versus $0 for females. The per capita income for the CDP was $19,406. There were no families and 5.6% of the population living below the poverty line, including no under eighteens and 33.3% of those over 64.

Education
Dot Lake is part of the Alaska Gateway School District. Dot Lake School, a K-12 campus, serves community students.

References

Tanana Athabaskans
Census-designated places in Alaska
Census-designated places in Southeast Fairbanks Census Area, Alaska
Census-designated places in Unorganized Borough, Alaska